Greg VanWoerkom (born July 24, 1980) is a Republican member of the Michigan House of Representatives.

Before being elected as state representative, VanWoerkom was the district director for United States Representative Bill Huizenga. VanWoerkom also served as the senior policy adviser to United States Representative Pete Hoekstra. VanWoerkom is a member of the Covenant Life Church.

In 2021, VanWoerkom proposed legislation to prohibit Michigan's Secretary of State from mailing ballot applications to voters. VanWoerkom argued this was necessary to prevent "confusion among the public". This came in the wake of the 2020 elections where President Donald Trump and Michigan Republicans spread confusion about ballot applications sent by Michigan Secretary of State Jocelyn Benson to voters, conflating the ballot applications with actual ballots. VanWoerkom's proposal was part of a larger nationwide effort by Republicans to restrict voting rights in the aftermath of the 2020 elections where Donald Trump and other Republicans made false claims of fraud.

References

External links 
 Greg VanWoerkom at gophouse.com
 Greg VanWoerkom at ballotpedia.org
 Greg VanWoerkom at votesmart.org

Living people
1980 births
Calvin University alumni
Eastern Michigan University alumni
People from Muskegon County, Michigan
Republican Party members of the Michigan House of Representatives
21st-century American politicians